There are various mobile games in the Crash Bandicoot series.

Platform
 is a 2D platform mobile game published by I-play, developed by Vivendi Universal Games and released on November 6, 2004. The game's plot centers on Crash Bandicoot and Doctor Neo Cortex, who have reluctantly teamed up to stop the Evil Twins from stealing all of the Wumpa fruit and destroying their island home. The game features six levels; the objective of each is to play as Crash and protect Cortex from danger while collecting the energy crystals needed to activate the Reverso Engine, which will enable Crash and Cortex to enter the Tenth Dimension and defeat the Evil Twins. Levi Buchanan of IGN, giving the game a score of 7.3 out of 10, considered the game to be "infinitely more enjoyable" than its console counterpart, pointing out the colorful graphics and "well-done" character art, but noting the insensitive controls and lack of audio as negative points. Avery Score of GameSpot, giving the game a score of 7.1 out of 10, commented positively on the "tried-and-true" gameplay, "great" graphics, "decent" value and "good" character likenesses, but criticized the lack of in-game audio, "finicky" control, lack of innovation in terms of gameplay, lack of enemy characters and the fact that Cortex seemed "mindless".

 is a 2D platform mobile game published by In-Fusio and developed by Kaolink for the ExEn and released on April 25, 2005. The player controls Crash Bandicoot, who can jump, spin, slide, crawl and belly flop depending on the player's input. Crash Bandicoot is the longest game made for the ExEn, spanning 18 levels split into four "worlds" of differing aesthetic theme, including an Aztec city and an icy mountain. The objective of each level is to collect wumpa fruit and the two jewels hidden in each level. In addition, obstacles such as bottomless pits and TNT crates must be avoided. The WGR staff of GameSpot, giving the game a score of 9 out of 10, praised the game for its tight gameplay, "pretty" graphics and high replay value.

 is a 3D platform mobile game published by Vivendi Games Mobile and Wonderphone and developed by Kuju Entertainment for an exclusive selection of 3G java-enabled handsets that accompanied the commercial launch of Vodafone live!, including the Motorola E1000, V980 and C980, the Nokia 6630, the Sony Ericsson V800, the Sharp 802 SH and 902 SH, and the Toshiba V902T. The player controls Crash Bandicoot, who must sprint along a "colorful undulating" three-dimensional road and dodge obstacles, defeat enemies and collect items en route. If Crash comes into contact with a hazard, one of three available lives will be lost. Chris James of Pocket Gamer, giving the game a score of 5 out of 10, noted the game's simple and relatively responsive controls and polished presentation, but criticized the awkward perspective, "very finicky" collision detection, lengthy character animation and long loading screens.

 is a 2D platform beat 'em up mobile game published by Vivendi Games Mobile and developed by DeValley Entertainment. It is loosely based on the console game of the same name. The player controls Crash Bandicoot, who is able to "jack" enemies during fights, slamming a mask over their heads to take control of them. The game includes a fighting system including punches, flying kicks, combo attacks and a special counter-move. Vivendi Games Mobile held a competition in the United Kingdom open to customers of the O2 Store for a chance to appear in the special version of the game as a character named "Dimbo". To be eligible, contestants had to download Crash Boom Bang! from the O2 Active portal; alternatively, contestants could enter via email. The competition was won by Stephen Massart, whose head was superimposed onto an enemy character to create Dimbo (while in the regular version of the game the Dimbos resemble elephant mutants). Damien McFerran of Pocket Gamer, giving the game a score of 5 out of 10, commended the "generally stunning" graphics and "excellent" level design, but criticized the "unforgivably poor" combat system and "repetitive" gameplay.

 is an action and platform mobile game developed by Vivendi Games Mobile and published by Glu Mobile for the BlackBerry and Java ME, released on July 30, 2009. Jon Mundy of Pocket Gamer, giving the game a score of 8 out of 10, reviewed the mobile game as a "recovery" for the series and praised the game's "excellent" level design and "tight" controls.

Crash Bandicoot: On the Run! is an auto-runner mobile spin-off game, soft launched on Android in select regions in Southeast Asia on April 22, 2020. The game is being published by King, and was released officially in March 25, 2021.

Racing
Crash Nitro Kart is a racing mobile game published and developed by I-play and released on September 20, 2004. The game's plot centers on Crash Bandicoot, Doctor Neo Cortex, Coco Bandicoot and Crunch Bandicoot as they are kidnapped by the ruthless Emperor Velo XXVII and forced to race in his galactic coliseum. The game features three selectable racetracks (City, Beach and Castle) and four playable characters (Crash, Cortex, Crunch and Coco), each with unique characteristics. Power-ups scattered on the racetracks can be used to accelerate the performance of the player's kart or hinder opponents. Damon Brown of GameSpot, giving the game a score of 6.1 out of 10, commended the game for its fast gameplay, solid graphics and funny characters, but criticized the small visuals, confusing items, lack of variety, controls that are "hard on the thumb" and the fact that the game "gets boring quickly".

 is a racing mobile game published by Vivendi Games Mobile and developed by Kaolink. The player selects from four characters to control (Crash, Cortex, Nina and Pasadena), all of whom race in karts. there are two modes of gameplay, Single Race and Tournament, with the tracks in the former mode only becoming available once the latter mode has been completed. There are nine tracks in the game split into three aesthetic themes: Pirate, Castle and Egypt. The objective of each track is to complete three laps ahead of the other three racers. Rob Hearn of Pocket Gamer, giving the game a score of 4 out of 10, said that while Crash Racing is "not offensive in terms of gameplay, Crash manages to offend nevertheless by being lazy, brief, and all but identical to Cocoto Kart Racer," and summed up the game as "Cocoto, but with a shoddier kingpin."

 is a racing mobile game developed by IP4U for JME-compatible mobile phones.

Crash Bandicoot Nitro Kart 3D is a racing mobile game published by Activision (originally released by Vivendi Games Mobile) and developed by Polarbit for the iPhone / iPod Touch, N-Gage service, and Zeebo. The game was released on the App Store in Europe on June 9, 2008 and in North America on July 9, 2008.

Crash Bandicoot Nitro Kart 2 is a racing mobile game published by Activision and developed by Polarbit for the iPhone and iPod Touch. It was released on the App Store on May 27, 2010.

Party
 is a party mobile game published by Vivendi Games Mobile. The game is loosely based on the Nintendo DS title of the same name and features 14 minigames centered around characters of the Crash Bandicoot series, including Crash, Coco, Cortex and Nina. All minigames are simple in input and only require one thumb to play. The game's single-player mode allows the player to either play individual minigames or play them all in a row to accumulate the highest score. The multiplayer mode includes free-for-all games, in which the players all must lay thumbs on the handset to compete. Producer Elodie Larre described adapting a party game for the mobile phone as a "big challenge". Not wanting to make "another multiplayer game where the players just pass the phone to each other" and hoping to attract both old and new fans of the series, the development team decided to integrate the mobile phone itself into the minigames, creating such minigame gimmicks as playing with one hand behind the back, with one eye closed, playing with the chin, etc. The biggest challenge for the team was keeping the minigames inside the phone's memory, which was cited as slightly inferior to the first PlayStation console. The WarioWare series was described as an influence in making the game. Stuart Dredge of Pocket Gamer, giving the game a score of 6 out of 10, described the collection of minigames as "a mixed bag", but said that the multiplayer challenges were "relatively fun".

 is a Japanese party mobile game published by Vivendi Games Mobile for the DoCoMo SH904i.

References

Crash Bandicoot games
Mobile games